The M36 class (X10 class post 1924) was a class of steam locomotives built for the New South Wales Government Railways in Australia.

History

In the late 1860s, four more of the 1 class where manufactured by Mort's Dock Sydney in 1870-71. Another four locomotives of the M.36 class were manufactured at Eveleigh Railway Workshops in 1876-77 using re-built tenders from Locomotive No.1-4. Two of the class later had cab shelters fitted to the tenders for suburban running.

Preservation
All engines of the class were scrapped in the period 1891-1904 with the exception of No. 78

See also
 NSWGR steam locomotive classification

References

Railway locomotives introduced in 1870
36
Standard gauge locomotives of Australia
0-4-2 locomotives